Hennenbach is a district of the city of Ansbach in Bavaria, Germany. It forms a small part of the north-east of Ansbach.

Ansbach (district)